The 1985 National Soccer League season was the sixty-second season under the National Soccer League (NSL) name. The season began on May 12, 1985, and concluded in early October 1985 with the NSL Championship final where Toronto Italia successfully defended their title against Windsor AC Roma. London Marconi secured the regular-season title by finishing first in the standings, and Dinamo Latino won the NSL Cup. 

After the conclusion of the 1984 season, the North American Soccer League (NASL) ceased operations with former NASL member Toronto Blizzard joining the National Soccer League as the league remained one of the few professional soccer leagues operating throughout the country.

Overview 
The demise of the American-based North American Soccer League (NASL) in late 1984 brought about a significant change to the Canadian soccer landscape as the NASL contained several Canadian teams throughout its existence. Once the NASL ceased operations Canada was without a national major soccer league as its previous attempt at organizing a domestic national league in 1983 failed after a single season. In relation to the void of a national top-tier league, the Ontario-based National Soccer League (NSL) announced its intentions of expanding nationally and received corporate sponsorship from Molson Brewery. The NSL was aided by the addition of the former NASL club Toronto Blizzard as the club's owners purchased the NSL franchise rights of Dinamo Latino in June 1985. According to league bylaws, the Blizzards operated under the name Toronto Dinamo as the name change required the approval of the league's board of directors. The NSL managed to expand into Quebec through an affiliated league known as the Quebec National Soccer League (LNSQ), which officially debuted the following season.  

Simultaneously the Canadian Soccer Association (CSA) also began making preliminary plans for a potential domestic national soccer league to address the void. Though the NSL ownership was attempting national expansion several of their noted clubs (Toronto Croatia, Toronto Dinamo, Toronto Italia, and Toronto Panhellenic) submitted applications to the CSA supported league. The plan was officially sanctioned by the CSA with the league expected to debut for the 1987 season, but unfortunately, the majority of the NSL clubs were rejected as the CSA adopted a policy to Canadianize the league with no ethnic affiliated clubs. Only Toronto Dinamo under its previous name as the Toronto Blizzard was granted a franchise. The membership in the NSL increased to eight teams with Windsor AC Roma being granted an NSL franchise, which marked the return of professional soccer to Windsor, Ontario since the 1978 season when the Windsor Stars competed in the league.

Teams

Coaching changes

Playoffs

Finals

References

External links
RSSSF CNSL page
thecnsl.com - 1985 season

 
1985–86 domestic association football leagues
National Soccer League
1985